Acacia pinguiculosa is a shrub of the genus Acacia and the subgenus Plurinerves that is endemic to an area of south western Australia.

Description
It has glabrous or sometimes hairy branchlets. Like most species of Acacia it has phyllodes rather than true leaves. The glabrous and evergreen phyllodes are ascending to erect and have a linear or obovate to oblanceolate-oblong shape and are substraight to slightly incurved. It blooms from August to October and produces white-yellow flowers.

Taxonomy
There are two recognised subspecies:
 Acacia pinguiculosa subsp. pinguiculosa
 Acacia pinguiculosa subsp. teretifolia

Distribution
It is native to an area in the Great Southern and Goldfields-Esperance regions of Western Australia where it is commonly situated on granite hills and outcrops, rises, low ranges and undulating plains growing in loam, clay, gravelly sandy or loamy sandy soils over or around granite or laterite.. The range of the shrub extends from around Frank Hann National Park in the north west to around Ravensthorpe in the soith and out to near Cape Le Grand National Park and Mount Burdett in the east where they are usually a part of low scrub, shrub mallee or heathland communities.

See also
 List of Acacia species

References

pinguiculosa
Acacias of Western Australia
Taxa named by Bruce Maslin
Plants described in 1999